Luann de Lesseps (née Nadeau; born May 17, 1965)is an American socialite, television personality, model, author, and singer. In 1993, she married French entrepreneur and aristocrat Count Alexandre de Lesseps; they divorced in 2009 but she retained the courtesy title "countess" until her remarriage in 2016. In 2008, de Lesseps came to prominence after being cast in the reality television series The Real Housewives of New York City, which documents the lives of several women residing in New York City. In 2018, she began headlining "Countess and Friends", a cabaret show of her own making.

Early life
Born LuAnn Nadeau, she was raised in Berlin, Connecticut, where she grew up with her six siblings, and where her father owned a construction company. She has said her father is of Algonquin and French descent and that her mother is French Canadian.  In an early episode of Real Housewives, de Lesseps shared that she had captained her high school varsity softball team.

Career
De Lesseps was formerly a licensed practical nurse in Connecticut, as well as a Wilhelmina model.

She is one of the main cast members on Bravo's reality series The Real Housewives of New York City. For the sixth season, she was demoted to a recurring "Friend of the Housewives" role due to not living in New York City at the time of filming. In April 2015, it was confirmed that de Lesseps would be returning as a main cast member for the show's seventh season.

In February 2011, de Lesseps guest starred on Law & Order: Special Victims Unit, in the episode "Bully", playing a socialite who makes a gruesome discovery.

De Lesseps wrote a book, Class with the Countess: How to Live with Elegance and Flair (published by Gotham Books) released April 16, 2009, and released her first record, "Money Can't Buy You Class" (through Ultra Records), on May 25, 2010.  She released her second single, "Chic C'est la Vie" in June 2011. She released a third single, "Girl Code", on July 6, 2015. In June 2019, De Lesseps released her fourth single, "Feeling Jovani". In September 2020, she released her fifth single, "Viva La Diva", with Grammy-winning songwriter and producer Desmond Child.

In February 2017, de Lesseps played a role in the film Maternal Secrets in Bermuda.

In May 2017, de Lesseps appeared in the celebrity roast of Michael Musto alongside Bianca Del Rio, Jinkx Monsoon, Orfeh, Michael Riedel, Randy Rainbow, Crystal Demure, Judy Gold, and Randy Jones. The roast which was produced by Daniel DeMello and directed by Rachel Klein, was hosted by Bruce Vilanch and introduced by Rosie O'Donnell. 

In February 2018, de Lesseps headlined her own cabaret show, called #CountessAndFriends, at Feinstein's/54 Below in Midtown Manhattan. The show features de Lesseps singing songs about her life as a countess and reality TV star, with appearances from celebrity friends like Rachel Dratch and Housewives co-star Sonja Morgan. In August 2018 de Lesseps announced that she was taking the show on tour, with engagements scheduled in Long Island and New Jersey.

De Lesseps has been a guest on Monét X Change's podcast The X Change Rate.

De Lesseps starred in The Real Housewives Ultimate Girls Trip, a spin-off featuring various women from The Real Housewives franchise, that premiered on Peacock in November 2021.

Legal problems
In December 2017, de Lesseps was arrested in Palm Beach, Florida on charges of disorderly intoxication, resisting arrest, battery of an officer, and making threats against a public servant. She was later released on her own recognizance, but was charged with a third-degree felony on January 25, 2018. After her release she entered an alcohol treatment program. 

In July 2018, de Lesseps settled the charges stemming from her Palm Beach arrest, by agreeing to plead guilty to the misdemeanor charges of battery, disorderly intoxication, and trespassing. In exchange, the felony charge of resisting an officer with violence was dropped, and de Lesseps agreed to fulfill 50 hours of community service, attend two Alcoholics Anonymous meetings, and to abstain from drinking alcohol for one year.

In May 2019, de Lesseps was taken into custody over her alleged probation violations and later released. She completed her probation in August 2019.

In 2021, de Lesseps dined at Le Diplomate, an upscale Washington D.C. restaurant, and left without paying the bill. Several days later, de Lesseps paid her outstanding bill.

Advocacy 
De Lesseps has donated to many charitable organizations, including: The American Cancer Society, GLAAD, and ACE Partnership for the Homeless. She has most recently partnered with The Fortune Society, which supports formerly incarcerated inmates by helping them reenter into society.

Personal life 
In 1993, she married Count Alexandre de Lesseps, and together they have two children, Noel and Victoria. They divorced in 2009. On December 31, 2016, de Lesseps married Tom D’Agostino Jr., losing her “countess” courtesy title in the process. In August 2017, de Lesseps announced that she and D'Agostino were getting divorced. In October 2017, it was reported that the divorce had been settled out of court and would be finalized "imminently".

On July 16, 2018, de Lesseps' RHONY co-star Bethenny Frankel announced that de Lesseps had chosen to skip the filming of the show's reunion to re-enter an alcohol treatment program. De Lesseps left the facility after just under three weeks.

On March 16, 2022, de Lesseps was filmed taking over the microphone and saying obscenities to the crowd at a piano bar in New York City. On March 18, 2022 de Lesseps released a statement apologizing for her actions and admitting her struggle with alcohol is still real.

Discography

Singles

References

External links

1965 births
Living people
21st-century American women singers
21st-century American women writers
American dance musicians
Female models from Connecticut
American women pop singers
American women nurses
Place of birth missing (living people)
American people of French-Canadian descent
American socialites
LuAnn de
Etiquette writers
People from Berlin, Connecticut
The Real Housewives cast members
Ultra Records artists
Singers from Connecticut
Writers from Connecticut
Writers from New York (state)
American people who self-identify as being of Native American descent
Countesses
21st-century American singers